John Paul Taylor (August 24, 1920 – February 12, 2023) was an American politician who was a Democratic member of the New Mexico House of Representatives from 1987 to 2005. Taylor attended New Mexico State University and was a teacher and academic administrator in Las Cruces, New Mexico. During his time in the House, he was known as "the conscience of the legislature" and chaired the House Health and Human Services Committee. He turned 100 in August 2020, and died from a heart attack at his home in Mesilla, New Mexico, on February 12, 2023, at the age of 102.

References

1920 births
2023 deaths
American centenarians
Men centenarians
Democratic Party members of the New Mexico House of Representatives
New Mexico State University alumni
People from Doña Ana County, New Mexico
20th-century American politicians
21st-century American politicians